The Hong Kong women's cricket team toured the United Arab Emirates in April 2022 to play a four-match bilateral Women's Twenty20 International (WT20I) series. The venue for the series was the Malek Cricket Ground in Ajman. The UAE won all of the matches, to win the series 4–0, taking their unbeaten run in WT20I cricket to fourteen matches.

Squads

Shubha Venkataraman and Rinitha Rajith were both named as reserves in the UAE's squad.

WT20I series

1st WT20I

2nd WT20I

3rd WT20I

4th WT20I

References

External links
 Series home at ESPNcricinfo

Associate international cricket competitions in 2021–22
2022 in Emirati cricket
Hong Kong cricket tours of the United Arab Emirates
Hong Kong 2021–22